The Sunset Trail is a 1924 American silent Western film directed by Ernst Laemmle and starring William Desmond, Gareth Hughes, and Lucille Hutton.

Plot summary

Cast

Preservation
With no prints of The Sunset Trail located in any film archives, it is a lost film.

Bibliography
 Munden, Kenneth White. The American Film Institute Catalog of Motion Pictures Produced in the United States, Part 1. University of California Press, 1997.

References

External links
 
 
 

1924 films
1924 Western (genre) films
Films directed by Ernst Laemmle
Universal Pictures films
American black-and-white films
Silent American Western (genre) films
1920s English-language films
1920s American films